Jami Rafati (born 26 April 1994) is an Italian footballer who plays as a central midfielder.

Club career
Rafati's professional career started after he signed a contract in 2011 with West Ham United. In the summer of 2013, he moved to Genoa being valued at €100,000. Jami Rafati made his debut in Serie A on 3 May 2014 playing from the start for Genoa against Sassuolo, and the match ended 0–0.

Rafati signed a contract on 7 July 2014 with newly relegated Serie B team Livorno until 2016.

On 12 November 2018, he was released from his contract with Pistoiese by mutual consent.

International career
Because he was born in Italy but has an Iranian father, Jami Rafati is eligible to play for the national team of Italy or Iran. However, he has not yet been called up by either team and remains uncapped.

References

External links
 

1994 births
Footballers from Florence
Living people
Italian people of Iranian descent
Italian footballers
U.S. Livorno 1915 players
A.C.R. Messina players
U.S. Pistoiese 1921 players
Serie B players
Sportspeople of Iranian descent
Association football midfielders